Srindra Varmana  according to the Skanda Purana was a king of the Kamboja kingdom. He is said to have installed the image of Varahadeva in his capital and made a gold throne for it.

See also
Chandravarma Kamboja
Kamatha Kamboja
Sudakshina Kamboja

References

Kambojas